Paronychomys is an extinct genus of Cricetidae that existed in Arizona during the Hemphillian period.

Taxonomy
Three species of Paronychomys are known: P. alticuspis, P. lemredfieldi, and P. tuttlei. "Paronychomys" shotwelli, described by Korth (2011) from Hemphilian-age deposits in Oregon, is now placed in the separate genus Tsaphanomys.

References

Cricetidae
Miocene rodents
Fossils of the United States